Paul Seelig (5 October 1900 – 5 August 1931) was a Swedish actor. He appeared in about 15 roles in films 1913 and 1931. His film debut was in Mauritz Stiller's film En pojke i livets strid in 1913, when he was thirteen years old.

He was the son of the actor and tour leader Emil van der Osten (1848-1905) and the actress Lotten Lundberg-Seelig (1867-1924).
Paul Seelig left Sweden in the late 1920s, first to film in Germany, then at Paramount in Paris. In the summer of 1931, he was killed in France, under yet-unknown circumstances.

Selected filmography
 En pojke i livets strid (1913)
 A Wild Bird (1921)
 Vem dömer (1922)
 Johan Ulfstjerna (1923)
 The People of Simlang Valley (1924)
 Charles XII (1925)
 The Österman Brothers' Virago (1925)
 Min fru har en fästman (1926)
 Arnljot (1927)
 Trådlöst och kärleksfullt (1931)
 Generalen (1931)

References 
 
Werner, Gösta (1991). Mauritz Stiller: ett livsöde. Stockholm: Prisma. Libris 7407745.  (inb.)

External links

1900 births
1931 deaths
Swedish male film actors
Swedish male silent film actors
20th-century Swedish male actors